Fábio Gomes da Silva (born 4 August 1983 in Campinas) is a Brazilian pole vaulter.

His personal best jump is 5.80 metres (outdoor) set in February 2011, and 5.70 metres (indoor) set in February 2013, both achieved in São Caetano do Sul, Brazil.  He held the South American and Brazilian records for the event from 2011 until 2013, when both marks were beaten by Augusto de Oliveira.

Achievements

References

External links
 
 
 

1983 births
Living people
Brazilian male pole vaulters
Olympic athletes of Brazil
Pan American Games athletes for Brazil
Athletes (track and field) at the 2007 Pan American Games
Athletes (track and field) at the 2008 Summer Olympics
Athletes (track and field) at the 2011 Pan American Games
Athletes (track and field) at the 2012 Summer Olympics
Athletes (track and field) at the 2015 Pan American Games
Sportspeople from Campinas
World Athletics Championships athletes for Brazil
Pan American Games gold medalists for Brazil
Pan American Games medalists in athletics (track and field)
South American Games gold medalists for Brazil
South American Games medalists in athletics
Competitors at the 2002 South American Games
Medalists at the 2007 Pan American Games
21st-century Brazilian people